The 2013 UK Kids Choice Awards  were held on 24 March 2013. The show followed a similar format as the one in the United States, with seven unique categories for the UK. Voting started on February 16, 2013. The awards show gained 281,000 views and the pre-show received 201,000 views. It was the #1 rating of all children’s channels in the UK and Ireland on Sunday 24 March 2013.

UK Categories 

This year the Nickelodeon UK Kids' Choice Awards had 7 unique categories, 6 remain the same as previous year but one category changed from Favourite UK Newcomer to Sports Star. Below is a list of UK categories and their nominees. Bold text represents the winner.

Favourite UK Band
 One Direction
 The Wanted
 Little Mix
 Lawson

Favourite UK Female Artist
 Jessie J
 Adele
 Rita Ora
 Cheryl Cole

Favourite UK Male Artist
 Conor Maynard
 Olly Murs
 Ed Sheeran
 Labrinth

Favourite UK TV Show
 House of Anubis
 Doctor Who
 The X Factor
 Wolfblood

Favourite UK Actor
 Robert Pattinson
 Andrew Garfield
 Daniel Craig
 Matt Smith

Favourite UK Actress
 Emma Watson
 Keira Knightley
 Helena Bonham Carter
 Jenna-Louise Coleman

Favourite UK Sports Star
 Tom Daley
 Jessica Ennis
 Mo Farah
 Bradley Wiggins

References 

Nickelodeon Kids' Choice Awards
2013 awards
2013 awards in the United Kingdom